State Route 767 (SR 767) is a north–south state highway in the eastern portion of the U.S. state of Ohio. Currently, it is signed as an alternate route of SR 7. Its southern terminus is at an exit ramp on SR 7 in Bridgeport.  The route serves as a connector from northbound SR 7 to SR 7 Alternate, US 40, and US 250.  The route's northern terminus is where these U.S. routes overlap eastbound to cross the Ohio River into West Virginia.  SR 7A serves as a connector for all of these routes to I-70.

Major intersections

References

767
Transportation in Belmont County, Ohio
State highways in the United States shorter than one mile